Videodrone is the fourth and final studio album by the rock band Cradle of Thorns and the only album to be released under the name Videodrone. It was released in 1999 on Elementree Records. The intro of C.O.B. features a rendition by the band of the popular christmas song Silent Night, followed by instrumental noises for the rest of the track's duration.

Track listing

Personnel 
Adapted from the Videodrone liner notes.

Videodrone
 Rohan Cowden – keyboards, sampler
 Ty Elam – vocals
 Kris Kohls – drums, percussion
 David File – guitar
 Mavis – bass guitar, backing vocals
Additional musicians
 Lauren Boquette – vocals (10)
 Jonathan Davis – vocals (1)
 Sick Jacken – vocals (7)
 Big Duke – vocals (7)

Additional musicians (cont.)
 DJ Lethal – scratching (6)
 Fred Durst – vocals (6)
 Kelly Langely – vocals (8)
 Chris O'Brien – vocals and guitar (12)
 Brian "Head" Welch – guitar (10)
Production and additional personnel
 Reginald "Fieldy" Arvizu – production
 David Kahne – mixing (1, 5)
 Stephen Marcussen – mastering
 John X Volaitis – mixing (2–4, 6–12)

Release history

References

External links 
 

1999 albums
Cradle of Thorns albums
Reprise Records albums